Alexandre Marsoin (born March 25, 1989) is a professional racing driver from France.

Career

Formula Renault
After an early career in karting, Marsoin made his racing debut in 2005 in the Formula Renault Campus France series, finishing the year in eighth position. The following year he moved up to the French Formula Renault championship with the Epsilon Sport team, taking a single podium finish and fastest lap on his way to twelfth in the standings. He also took part in two races of the Eurocup Formula Renault 2.0 championship.

For 2007, he continued in French Formula Renault whilst also taking part in a full Eurocup Formula Renault season. Driving for SG Formula in the French series, he took six podiums, including two race wins, to finish third in the championship, behind team-mate and champion Jules Bianchi. In the Eurocup standings, he finished the year fourteenth overall.

Formula Renault 3.5 Series
In late 2007, Marsoin took part in Formula Renault 3.5 Series testing at the Circuit Paul Ricard and Circuit de Valencia with the Belgian KTR team, and in February 2008 he was signed by Spanish team Epsilon Euskadi to partner fellow rookie Mario Romancini.

During the 2008 season, Marsoin finished in the points on five occasions to end the year in nineteenth position, with his best race result being sixth-place finishes at both Spa-Francorchamps and Hungaroring. In the offseason, he tested for Tech 1 Racing, Prema Powerteam and Comtec Racing before signing for the latter in January 2009. However, he did not appear at any of the pre-season tests or the first round in Montmeló. He returned for the second round at Spa, but fell out with the team which led to him leaving the team during the weekend. He was replaced by Max Chilton for the next round.

Formula Three Euroseries
Marsoin replaced Jon Lancaster for the opening round of the 2009 Formula Three Euroseries season at Hockenheim. However, he left the team at Lausitz.

Career results

Complete Formula Renault 3.5 Series results
(key) (Races in bold indicate pole position) (Races in italics indicate fastest lap)

References

External links
Official website 
Career details from Driver Database

1989 births
Living people
French racing drivers
French Formula Renault 2.0 drivers
Formula Renault Eurocup drivers
Formula 3 Euro Series drivers
World Series Formula V8 3.5 drivers
Epsilon Euskadi drivers
SG Formula drivers
Comtec Racing drivers